The Age of Mortals series is a series of novels set in the Dragonlance setting.

For the Dungeons & Dragons game supplement, see Age of Mortals: Dragonlance Campaign Setting Companion.

Contents
 Conundrum (December 2001), by Jeff Crook,
 The Lioness (August 2002), by Nancy Varian Berberick,, Note: The Lioness is also featured in the short story "Freedom's Pride" from Rebels and Tyrants set prior to The Lioness.
 Dark Thane (November 2003), by Jeff Crook,
 Prisoner of Haven (June 2004), by Nancy Varian Berberick,, Note: The short story "Lost Causes" from Rebels and Tyrants serves as a prequel to Prisoner of Haven.
 Wizard's Conclave (July 2004), by Douglas Niles,
 The Lake of Death (October 2004), by Jean Rabe,, Note: Continues the story of Dhamon Grimwulf, the main antagonist from Dragons of a New Age and The Dhamon Saga.

References

Fantasy novel series
The Age of Mortals series novels